The Roof is a 1956 Italian drama film directed and produced by  Vittorio De Sica.

Plot
Natale, an apprentice bricklayer, and Luisa, who has no marketable skill, marry and try to live with Natale's parents and other relatives in one apartment, what might happen in the poorest classes in Rome about 1950. After a quarrel Natale and Luisa precipitately leave without a place to live. The remainder of the film is devoted to their finding housing. The solution is building a one-room brick dwelling as a squat on unused railway land on the outskirts of Rome. As it was illegal, Natale arranges his workmates to assist him during the night. According to the rules, if a  dwelling has a door and a roof the householder cannot be evicted. At dawn when the police arrive to remove them the dwelling is complete except for part of the roof, but a humane policeman looks the other way. The happy ending is not without realism. In financial straits, and facing imprisonment later, Natale and Luisa, now pregnant, will encounter difficulties ahead.

"[The Roof] is a confirmation of the power of neorealist principles ... De Sica has seen to it that every incident, every detail in every shot contributes to a sense of unstrained, unforced actuality" (Arthur Knight, Saturday Review). We have secured a recent restoration of the film that marked De Sica's final return to the classic neorealism of Bicycle Thieves after forays into romantic melodrama (Terminal Station) and Neapolitan comedy (The Gold of Naples). Two non-professional actors (one a soccer star) give winning performances as a newly married couple who, after a family quarrel, are left homeless in Rome. A bricklayer by trade, the husband conscripts his co-workers to help build an abode overnight, hoping that the police won't find the couple's new "roof" illegal and have it destroyed. "A lovely little seriocomic film ... deeply touching" (Bosley Crowther, The New York Times).

Honors 
The film was presented in the official selection in competition at the 1956 Cannes Film Festival where it received the Prix de l'Office Catholique (OCIC).

He also received the 1957 Silver Ribbon of Italian Cinema for the screenplay.

Restoration 
The film was restored in 1999 thanks to the Vittorio De Sica Friends Association and edited by Manuel De Sica. The restored film was then screened on April 4, 2004 at the Morlacchi Theater in Perugia.

Cast
 Gabriella Pallotta - Luisa (as Gabriella Pallotti)
 Giorgio Listuzzi - Natale, Luisa's husband
 Luisa Alessandri - Signora Baj
 Angelo Bigioni
 Maria Di Fiori - Giovanna, Natale's sister
 Maria Di Rollo - Gina
 Emilia Maritini - Luisa's mother
 Giuseppe Martini - Luisa's father
 Gastone Renzelli - Cesare, Giovanna's husband
 Maria Sittoro - Natale's mother
 Angelo Visentin - Natale's father

Awards
 1956 Cannes Film Festival: OCIC Award 
 Nastro d'Argento: Best Script.

References

External links

1956 films
1950s Italian-language films
Films set in Rome
Films shot in Rome
1956 drama films
Italian black-and-white films
Titanus films
Films directed by Vittorio De Sica
Films with screenplays by Cesare Zavattini
Films scored by Alessandro Cicognini
1950s Italian films